The 1971 Segunda División de Chile was the 20th season of the Segunda División de Chile.

Naval was the tournament's champion.

Table

See also
Chilean football league system

References

External links
 RSSSF 1971

Segunda División de Chile (1952–1995) seasons
Primera B
Chil